In medicine, the cingulate island sign is a finding on FDG-PET brain scans that metabolism in the posterior cingulate cortex is preserved. It can help to identify dementia with Lewy bodies (DLB) and distinguish it from Alzheimer's disease and other dementias.

References

Lewy body dementia
Alzheimer's disease